This is a list of monasteries founded during the Merovingian period, between the years c. 500 and c. 750.
The abbeys aren't 'Merovingian' as such, although there are quite a few monasteries which were founded under royal Merovingian patronage, especially in the 7th and early 8th centuries.

Sources

Ian Wood, The Frankish Kingdoms 450-750
J. M. Wallace-Hadrill, The Long-haired Kings [and other studies in Frankish History] (1962)
Gregory of Tours, Decem Libri Historianum

Notes

See also
Merovingian architecture
Merovingian art
Merovingian dynasty
Merovingian script

Merovingian architecture
Lists of Christian monasteries
Lists of buildings and structures
History-related lists